Soay (pronounced "soy") is the name of several Scottish islands. It is Sòdhaigh (sometimes anglicised "Soaigh") in Scottish Gaelic, and comes from the Old Norse so-ey meaning "island of sheep". It may refer to:

 Soay, Inner Hebrides off south west Skye
 Soay, St Kilda in the St Kilda group
 The neighbouring islands of Soay Mòr and Soay Beag in the Outer Hebrides

It may also refer to:
 Soay sheep the native, primitive sheep from St Kilda

See also
 Soa Island, south of Iona, Scotland